Pllakë (romanized: Pláka) is a village in Vlorë County, southern Albania. At the 2015 local government reform it became part of the municipality of Finiq. It is inhabited solely by Greeks. The village was formerly known as Memushbej.

Etymology
The former name of the village was of Albanian origin: Memushbej.

Demographics 
According to Ottoman statistics, the village had 71 inhabitants in 1895. The village had 489 inhabitants in 1993, all ethnically Greeks.

References

External links 
From Vurgu i Ri (Kainourio) to Plaka by car
Locals celebrating the Dormition of the Mother of God, 2014

Villages in Vlorë County
Greek communities in Albania